Thomas Whorwood of Holton (1718–1771) was High Sheriff of Oxfordshire.

Biography
Thomas was born in 1718. He was educated at John Roysse's Free School in Abingdon, (now Abingdon School) (1730–1735) and later Wadham College, Oxford.

In 1744, Thomas was appointed High Sheriff of Oxfordshire.

See also
 List of Old Abingdonians

References

1718 births
1771 deaths
High Sheriffs of Oxfordshire
People educated at Abingdon School
Alumni of Wadham College, Oxford